Whitfield, also known as Whitfield Estates, is an unincorporated community and census-designated place (CDP) in Manatee County, Florida, United States. As of the 2020 census it had a population of 2,989. It is part of the North Port–Sarasota–Bradenton Metropolitan Statistical Area. It receives its mail from the Sarasota post office located in Sarasota County.

History
Whitfield Estates was formerly a  wooded area that had been homesteaded by General John Riggin, aide-de-camp to Ulysses S. Grant. The property included the  bayfront estate of Alfred Ringling. In 1924, the property was purchased from Richard T. Ringling, son of Alfred, by a corporation called Whitfield Estates, Inc., held by Louis Broughton Whitfield, D. G. Haley, E. H. Price, and E. S. Delaplane, Jr., all residents of Alabama.

Louis Whitfield, a native of Montgomery, Alabama, and president and primary investor of the development, was founder and president of the Alaga Syrup Company and the W. W. Pickle Company. Many streets in the subdivision were named for the Whitfield family, including Broughton and Pearl. The original plan for Whitfield Estates called for a housing development, an 18-hole golf course, hotel, yacht basin and man-made islands in the bay. Donald Ross was retained as the golf course architect. Sometime during late 1925 or very early into 1926, L. B. Whitfield would leave the development and his interest was taken over by Adair realty.  In 1926, the developing neighborhood was incorporated as a city with E.S. Bond acting as mayor.

Like many other Florida Land Boom developments, it would never end up reaching the goals set by its developers. One of the first signs of financial trouble came when a decision was made to open membership of the Whitfield Estates County Club for residents of Sarasota and Bradenton if they agreed to take over the operating expenses associated with it. After the collapse of the boom, the residents of Whitfield would have difficulties staying there. Some homes would go through a series of different rentals while those that were under construction would end up being left unfinished for several years.

With the 1929 stock market crash and the arrival of the Great Depression, the conditions further worsened for residents there. During the years of the Great Depression there would be very little construction in Whitfield. In 1937 a group of club members ended up buying the golf course and club house, renaming it "Sarasota Bay Country Club". It was renamed once again in 1938 to "North Shore Country Club". During World War II, the club would close because of gasoline rationing and not being able to get golf balls. It ended up becoming overgrown, and after the war the US Army would help restore the golf course.

Whitfield Estates experienced a resurgence after World War II. Located near the Sarasota Army Airfield, the area became a popular location for families to settle during the post-war housing boom. This played a major role in the recovery of the community, with the Whitfield Community Improvement Association being established in the mid-1940s. The club was given its current name, "Sara Bay Country Club", in 1964.

National Register of Historic Places
The following districts and properties in the subdivision are listed on the National Register of Historic Places:

Most of the above were listed as part of the 1996 Whitfield Estates Subdivision Multiple Property Submission (MPS).

Geography
Whitfield is in southern Manatee County, on the northeast shore of Sarasota Bay. It is bordered to the north by Bowlees Creek and the unincorporated community of Bayshore Gardens, and to the southeast by Sarasota–Bradenton International Airport.

Demographics

As of the 2000 U.S. Census, there were 2,984 people, 1,244 households, and 878 families residing in the CDP. The racial makeup of the CDP was 94.27% White, 2.98% African American, 0.13% Native American, 0.70% Asian, 0.07% Pacific Islander, 0.80% from other races, and 1.04% from two or more races. Hispanic or Latino of any race were 4.73% of the population.

There were 1,244 households, out of which 21.9% had children under the age of 18 living with them, 58.0% were married couples living together, 9.1% had a female householder with no husband present, and 29.4% were non-families. 20.8% of all households were made up of individuals, and 8.9% had someone living alone who was 65 years of age or older.  The average household size was 2.40 and the average family size was 2.75.

In the CDP, the population was spread out, with 17.9% under the age of 18, 6.2% from 18 to 24, 26.9% from 25 to 44, 28.3% from 45 to 64, and 20.7% who were 65 years of age or older.  The median age was 44 years. For every 100 females, there were 96.1 males.  For every 100 females age 18 and over, there were 94.3 males.

The median income for a household in the CDP was $51,536, and the median income for a family was $54,009. Males had a median income of $35,444 versus $24,375 for females. The per capita income for the CDP was $25,408.  About 3.3% of families and 6.3% of the population were below the poverty line, including 8.3% of those under age 18 and 6.6% of those age 65 or over.

References

Census-designated places in Manatee County, Florida
Sarasota metropolitan area
Census-designated places in Florida
Populated places on the Intracoastal Waterway in Florida
National Register of Historic Places Multiple Property Submissions in Florida